Granville is a census-designated place located in Granville Township, Mifflin County in the state of Pennsylvania, United States.  It is located near the Juniata River in south-central Mifflin County.  As of the 2010 census, the population was 440 residents.

Demographics

References

Census-designated places in Mifflin County, Pennsylvania
Census-designated places in Pennsylvania